The AA20 was a one-off steam locomotive constructed by the Soviet Union under the dictatorship of Joseph Stalin.

Wheel arrangement 
The AA20 was a "4-14-4" locomotive (using the Whyte notation classification of steam locomotives by wheel arrangement). It featured four leading wheels, fourteen coupled driving wheels (seven axles) in a rigid frame, and four trailing wheels.

Equivalent classifications in other notations would have been:
UIC classification: 2G2 (also known as German classification and Italian classification)
French classification: 272
Turkish classification: 711
Swiss classification: 7/11
Russian classification: 2-7-2

History 
The sole example of this type, called the AA20-1, was built by the Soviet Union. The designation stands for Andrey Andreyev (who sponsored its construction), 20 ton axle load. While some builders had produced twelve-coupled (six driving axles) designs, no one had ever built a fourteen-coupled engine. The AA20-1 holds two records: the largest number of coupled axles on a locomotive, and being the longest rigid frame locomotive in Europe. It was the largest rigid frame locomotive in the world until 1939, when the PRR S1 was unveiled.

The large number of driving axles were meant to spread out the locomotive's weight, reducing the axle load and the resulting stress on the track. A group of Soviet locomotive engineers had visited the United States, and presumably they had seen the 4-12-2 locomotives being used by the Union Pacific. The 4-14-4 could be viewed as an expansion of that type. Unlike the successful Union Pacific locomotives, however, the AA20-1 was a complete failure.

The AA20-1 was originally intended to be a 2-14-4 (1'G2'). Construction was chiefly undertaken in Essen, Germany by Krupp, following a Soviet design. Later, the unfinished locomotive was moved to Lugansk, where a two-axle leading truck was fitted. The trailing trucks supported a huge firebox. The AA20-1 was intended to run on low-quality coal, so a lot of space was needed to burn it in order to provide enough heat to the boiler.

This required adaptations to negotiate curves. The center three driving axles were blind, and the first and seventh driving axles were fitted with lateral motion devices. These measures were not enough to make the AA20-1 work properly, however. As a result of its massive size and long wheelbase, it was too heavy and prone to frequent derailments, expanding the track and destroying points of the switches it passed over. It was too big to fit on the turntables, too powerful for the couplers in use at the time and unable to run at full power for very long due to the poor-grade coal being insufficient to provide full steam capacity for the massive boiler.

The AA20-1 made one publicity trip to Moscow in 1935 before being put into storage at the Shcherbinka test facility (potentially as an instructional tool) and finally scrapped in 1960, though this was not stated publicly.

See also
 History of rail transport in Russia
 Russian Railway Museum, Saint Petersburg

References

External links
Stalin's Engine: The AA20

14,4-14-4
Steam locomotives of the Soviet Union
Scrapped locomotives